The 1958 Oregon State Beavers football team represented Oregon State College in the Pacific Coast Conference (PCC) during the 1958 NCAA University Division football season.  In their fourth season under head coach Tommy Prothro, the Beavers compiled a 6–4 record (5–3 in PCC, fourth), and were outscored 98 to 118. They played three home games on campus at Parker Stadium in Corvallis and two at Multnomah Stadium in Portland.

This was the final football season in the PCC, which disbanded the following spring; Oregon State was an independent for the next five seasons.

Schedule

References

External links
 Game program: Oregon State at Washington State – November 8, 1958

Oregon State
Oregon State Beavers football seasons
Oregon State Beavers football